The People's Party of Castile and León (PP) is the regional section of the People's Party of Spain (PP) in Castile and León. It was formed in 1989 from the re-foundation of the People's Alliance.

Its president is Alfonso Fernández Mañueco, current president of the Junta de Castilla y León. He succeeded Juan Vicente Herrera, former president of the Junta de Castilla y León, who had been in office for fourteen years. He currently governs in Ávila, Burgos, León, Palencia and Salamanca.

Electoral performance

Cortes of Castile and León

Cortes Generales

European Parliament

References 

People's Party (Spain)
Political parties in Castile and León